are a Japanese rock band from Nagoya, Japan, who were formed in 2007. The band combines melodic singing with screams typical of the post-hardcore genre. Although the band is Japanese, all of their songs are written in English. The lineup consists of lead vocalist Masato Hayakawa, guitarists Ryo Yokochi (Y.K.C.) and Kazuya Sugiyama (Sugi), bassist Ryo Shimizu (RxYxO) and drummer Katsuma Minatani. Hayakawa has a Japanese father and an American mother and speaks both Japanese and English fluently.

The band's first two albums, Final Destination and The Enemy Inside, were both released exclusively in their home country of Japan. The group made their worldwide debut in 2014 with the reissue of The Revelation, which was previously released in 2013 under the label VAP, with the worldwide edition being released under Hopeless Records and Sony Music.

Coldrain later released Vena (2015), Fateless (2017) and The Side Effects (2019). Their seventh studio album Nonnegative was released on July 6, 2022. They are best known for their songs "Mayday", "Gone", "Coexist", "Paradise (Kill the Silence)", "Die Tomorrow", "No Escape", "The Revelation", "Envy" and "Feed the Fire".

History

2007–2008: Formation and major label debut 
After the disbanding of the bands Wheel of Life (RxYxO, Sugi and Y.K.C.) and AVER (Masato and Katsuma), Coldrain was formed on April 17, 2007, in Nagoya with Masato Hayakawa on vocals, RxYxO (Ryo) on bass guitar, Katsuma on drums, and Y.K.C (Yokochi) and Sugi on guitars. The common musical interest of the members was one of the decisive factors in the formation of coldrain. Once, when AVER and Wheel of Life first co-debuted on stage, and AVER heard Sevendust's song played during Wheel of Life's rehearsal, an excited Katsuma asked RxYxO, "Don't tell me you're a fan of Sevendust as well!?" Thereafter, each time they interacted, they wanted to form a new band together. RxYxO was originally doing vocals, but became a bassist because of coldrain. The band gained their first followers from performing as a local band in their home-town while distributing demo discs after each performance.

About a year after coldrain formed, they signed a major contract with VAP, and the band released their debut maxi single "Fiction" on 5 November 2008. They then set off for their first nationwide tour and played in 30 venues across Japan.

2009–2011: Final Destination and The Enemy Inside 

After the tour, the group released their next maxi single: 8AM. The limited edition included a DVD which featured the music video of the title song and three live videos: "Fiction", "Painting", and "Come Awake". "8AM" was also used as a theme song to the anime series Hajime no Ippo: New Challenger. In 2009, saw their first performance at the Summer Sonic Festival 2009. In October, they released their first album Final Destination and embarked on another successful sold-out nationwide tour.

The band released their debut EP: Nothing Lasts Forever on 23 June 2010. One of the songs, "We're Not Alone", was used as an opening theme of the anime series Rainbow: Nisha Rokubō no Shichinin. Another song, "Die Tomorrow", was used in the Pro Evolution Soccer 2011 soundtrack. They also went on tour with several bands, including Mucc, Avengers in sci-fi and Totalfat.

On 16 February 2011, Coldrain released their second album called The Enemy Inside, which keeps the melodic vocals and breakdown parts of the last songs. The song "The Maze" has Mah from band SiM singing in some parts. On 7 December of the same year, the band released their first DVD, Three Days of Adrenaline, which was recorded in three cities: Osaka, Nagoya and Tokyo. The DVD contains 19 tracks (all 10 songs from The Enemy Inside are included), 3 behind-the-scenes videos, exclusive performances, and the music videos of "To Be Alive" and "Rescue Me".

2012–2013: The Revelation 

On 20 April 2012, the band released a new song, "No Escape", which was used in the official trailer for the video game Resident Evil: Operation Raccoon City; the song was on the band's new EP, Through Clarity, released on the following 4 July. This is their first album recorded abroad in the US. The EP was produced by David Bendeth, famous for his collaborations with international artists like Paramore, All Time Low and A Day to Remember.

On 1 August, it was announced that because drummer Katsuma was devoting himself to medical treatment for a chronic hereditary disease, he was temporarily withdrawing from the band. Katsuma's withdrawal period includes three people, ZAX (Pay Money to My Pain), Tatsu (Crossfaith), and YOUTH-K!!!(BPM13GROOVE), playing the role of support drummer. During the summer, they finally returned to the stage at Summer Sonic Festival 2012. On 4 November, at Hiroshima University of Economics, two bands held a live performance, Maximum the Hormone and Coldrain. At that point Katsuma returned to the band.

On 30 November, coldrain announced they would be in the studio from December to February to record their third studio album with David Bendeth. On 2 March 2013, they performed at Megaport Music Festival in Kaohsiung for 5,000 people, along with many other artists such as Grizzly Bear, Cyndi Wang, Boris, Head Phones President, SiM, LTK Commune, Guntzepaula and Chochukmo. Shortly afterward, on 17 April, they released their third full-length album, The Revelation. On 5 May, the band held the opening date of The Revelation Tour in Chiba, Japan, at the same location where they performed during Ozzfest on 12 May.

2014: Worldwide debut 
 
In December 2013, Coldrain signed a record deal with Raw Power Management, a British company with many international bands to its name, including Bullet for My Valentine, Bring Me the Horizon, Of Mice & Men and Crossfaith. This allowed the group to go on a European tour with Bullet for My Valentine and Chiodos between February and March. Subsequent headline dates were also announced for the United Kingdom, along with the European release of the EP Through Clarity on 27 January, with free download of the song "Inside of Me" if the EP was preordered.

On 21 February, they announced release of the DVD The Score 2007-2013. 
On 18 January they recorded a live show called "One Man Show Evolve" for their second DVD, Evolve, which was released on 30 April of the same year. 
The album was also available on Blu-ray Disc, for the first time for the group.
During the same period came the news that coldrain would be performing at Rock am Ring, Rock im Park and Download Festival 2014 in June 2014.

On 9 April, the announcement came that coldrain had signed a contract with the American-based label Hopeless Records for a new edition of their third studio album, The Revelation, which would be released worldwide (except Asia, New Zealand, and Australia) for the first time. On the same day Hopeless released the eponymous single, "The Revelation". 

At the announcement of the international release of The Revelation, the singer Masato Hayakawa wrote:

"It's hard to put in words how excited and proud we are that The Revelation will be released Worldwide. The dream we've had ever since we started playing music is finally coming true. I can't wait for everyone to hear the songs, learn the words and sing them with us live. We are grateful for the many fans in our homeland that have supported us in becoming the band we are today. Without them this would have been impossible. This step will be the biggest in our careers and we couldn't be more ready." 
 
The international edition of the album was subsequently released on 23 June in Europe, and 24 June in North America. On 18 June they also released their third EP, Until the End in Japan. The EP contains 6 new tracks, 5 of which were also included in the international edition of The Revelation, which was released by Hopeless Records in June 2014 in Europe and North America. The band also announced the album's release in Australia, scheduled for 8 August of the same year (by Sony Music Australia), along with the news that the band would perform at Soundwave Festival 2015.

2015–2016: Vena 

On 27 June 2015, they performed at the Lunatic Fest (hosted by Luna Sea) at Makuhari Messe, alongside 9mm Parabellum Bullet, Dead End, Tokyo Yankees, Siam Shade, Fear, and Loathing in Las Vegas, Dir En Grey, X Japan and Luna Sea. On 28 August, the band released the song "Words of the Youth" from Vena, another lead-single "Gone" was later released on 16 September, both from their upcoming fourth studio album, which was eventually released worldwide on October 23, 2015, which was released only two days prior, on October 21, in Japan.

The record was promoted by a worldwide headlining tour "MAY EUROPEAN TOUR" with Wage War, The Charm the Fury and Counting Days in May 2016. The tour would start in Paris, France on May 9 and finished in Reading, England on May 27. The tour would also feature a spot for the Japanese rockers at Slam Dunk Festival on May 29, 30 and 31st.

Early in the morning of 20 March 2016, coldrain was involved in a bus crash while traveling from their recent stop in Texas to the next scheduled concert (support of "Silverstein 2016 USA Tour") in Oklahoma. They reported that no one was hurt, but they had to cancel their show in Tulsa as they had no means of transport to get there. In the summer, coldrain embarked on a tour across the United States (playing at Monster Energy South Stage) as a part of Vans Warped Tour.

On 17 August, Coldrain released their third maxi-single Vena II worldwide, with new songs "Born to Bleed" and "Undertow" and new acoustic versions of "Gone" and "The Story". The limited edition included a bonus DVD which featuring "VENA JAPAN TOUR 2016" held at Zepp Tokyo on 15 January 2016.

2017–2018: Fateless 

On 26 July 2017, Coldrain announced a new album to be called Fateless, it was released on 11 October 2017 worldwide. The limited edition of the album features a live CD with coldrain's 10-year anniversary performances in their hometown Nagoya.  One of the songs, "Feed the Fire", was used as an opening theme of the anime series King's Game The Animation.

The band's official tour, FATELESS JAPAN TOUR 2017, began on 29 October 2017. The tour spanned approximately the following two months and 15 venues across Japan,
ending with a concert on 6 February 2018 at the Nippon Budokan. 
Their performance at Nippon Budokan was recorded by their one of their previous music video director's Inni Vision. The performance was later distributed on DVD and Blu-Ray on 26 September the same year.

On 25 May 2018, it was announced that Coldrain would be an opening act alongside Volumes on Crown the Empire's European headline tour. The tour would span across the entire continent of Europe. It would start off at Brighton, United Kingdom on 18 September, and culminate in Amsterdam, Netherlands on 15 October 2018.

On 29 September 2018, a sequel to the popular video game Mobile Suit Gundam: Extreme Vs. was announced, with the release date slated for 30 October 2018. Alongside this, coldrain announced a new song titled "Revolution" which was to be the main theme for the game, released on 12 December. A music video for the song was released on 25 January 2019. Just a few days later, on 30 January, Masato Hayakawa announced that he was returning to the studio with the rest of the band to record a new album to be released later on in the year.

2019–2021: The Side Effects 

On 31 March 2019, Coldrain announced a new One Man Tour, which would be the subsequent headline show for the newly titled album called The Side Effects. The September tour would include 11 shows at 10 venues across Japan.

Coldrain went on a European tour in June 2019 to promote their upcoming record by playing the first single "Revolution" at all their shows, including major festivals such as Rock am Ring and Rock im Park, finishing off at the highly acclaimed Download Festival where they played on the Dogtooth Stage.

On 16 May 2019, a teaser for The Side Effects was released on all social media accounts which used the song "Coexist" which was eventually released in its entirety as a single on July 4 alongside a music video to complement its release which stacked up more than 345K+ views in just 3 weeks, which made it the fastest-growing music video they ever had at the time of release. On the same day, the release date was also announced and slated for release on August 28, 2019. The first album to not be released in October, since the release of The Revelation back in 2013 and 2014 internationally. The limited-edition included a documentary on the process of making the album along with some merchandise.

To continue hyping the release of the forthcoming album, they released music videos for "January 1st" and "The Side Effects", on August 8 and 27 respectively; the songs came out to huge success. Hayakawa had specifically asked for "January 1st" to get a music video because it was deeply personal to him, a ballad for the band which typically wouldn't become a single for an album produced by the band. The latter being the title track was used to commemorate the release of The Side Effects. Another song called "Mayday", featuring Ryo Kinoshita from Crystal Lake, was also used as the opening theme for the anime Fire Force. This would also get a music video on November 2, coinciding with the debut of the song as Fire Force's intro theme, also being the last single released by the band in the 2010s.

In the same month, Coldrain would later announce that their own annually hosted concert "BLAREDOWN BARRIERS" would be turned into a festival and renamed to "Blare Fest". Blare Fest would take place at Port Messe in Nagoya. The 2020 edition of the newly formed festival would announce bands such as One Ok Rock, We Came as Romans, Fever 333, The Word Alive, Volumes, Crossfaith and Crystal Lake, as well as many more, who would all play on two separate days with Coldrain headlining both days on February 1 and 2.

The band would release two new music videos for The Side Effects: "See You" on January 17, 2020, and "Speak" on March 21, 2020.

Due to the COVID-19 pandemic, Coldrain was forced to cancel or postpone many gigs. As a result, they released all three of their live DVDs on YouTube for free for a limited amount of time to help entertain their fans during lockdown, including Three Days of Adrenaline, Evolve and 20180206 Live at Budokan, along with the music video for "Speak". A notable gig that got cancelled was their highly anticipated performance at the Yokohama Arena in Yokohama, which was scheduled for October 18, 2020 that was later cancelled on September 4.

In regards to the performance at the Yokohama Arena, a venue of a capacity of 17,000, frontman Masato Hayakawa issued a statement:

 "Blarefest back in February, which hosted and announced the international acts.
In June, I had no choice but to announce the postponement of the tour in a hope that self-exclusion would begin and converge.
We'll be able to make it to the rocks by October, can't we?! I was thinking that it's all the same that I was expecting.
However, the reality is that we can't get together as the first member after
we put together Coldrain, the time when we can't play live blows, we can't perform even if we want to perform, we can't see any breakthroughs, and it's time to make this announcement.
Now that various forms have been explored and the number of festivals and artists holding festivals and artists has increased by reducing the number of people, it may appear that it is possible to hold them somehow.
But the final conclusion is that by the standards of Coldrain, we still can't see the "new shape" and we still have to endure it as a live band.
However, I don't feel like I can see Coldrain live when social distancing comes in to think about how many people can be packed into the arena by attacking the last minute, and sticking to how close I can get to the audience.
I was troubled. But there is no hesitation.
Because the situation is a situation, we have to use the word cancellation instead of postponing it, but what we can promise now is that we will definitely do it someday.
Without the risk or anxiety caused by the corona, let's endure it until it is in a state where we can help each other like that time, go on a rampage, scream from the bottom of our stomachs, and go home.
Let's make a happy live performance as much as you can endure.

Until then, I pray for everyone's health and dream of being able to welcome Coldrain's Yokohama Arena performance in perfect condition.
I'm not going to waste 10/18, and I'm trying to take on challenges that I've never done as a band that I can't see everyone live.
I'm just enduring it now, I'm not going to die! Regards from now on!"

Furthermore, it was simultaneously announced on the same day that the band would announce a new live video album Live & Backstage at Blare Fest. 2020 that would slated for release on October 28, 2020. It would feature their full performance on both days, as well as backstage footage of the band. To promote it, they released live performances of "Revolution" and "Final Destination" at Blarefest on the band's official YouTube channel.

The band would hold live events in the new year again amidst COVID-19 cases drastically dropping in Japan. They would go on a nationwide tour of Japan for their "Setlist Election" in which fans would vote for which songs will be performed on each day. Day 1 would be a selection of songs released from 20082013, while day 2 would be a selection of songs from 20142019. An official music video for "F.T.T.T" from Fateless would be recorded on the tour and published on YouTube on 4 June 2021.

2021present: Nonnegative 

On 6 August 2021, Coldrain revealed on their official Twitter account that they would be making an official announcement the following day to build up hype and speculation towards a new release by the band. The following day on 7 August, the band officially announced that they would be releasing a brand new single, titled "Paradise (Kill the Silence)" for the first time in two years on 17 September 2021, as well as a one-man tour announcement called "Paradise" in support of the single's release taking place during October and November 2021, with ticket sales already being allocated for the tour taking place in 12 different venues across Japan. An exclusive of "Paradise (Kill the Silence)" was unveiled to the world for the first time as a debut live performance on the second edition of "Coldrain TV" on 16 September 2021. Mere hours later at midnight JST, the single was released and the music video for "Paradise (Kill the Silence)" was premiered on YouTube.

On 2 January 2022, the band announced that they had joined TikTok. On 28 January, the band released an official live music video of "Paradise (Kill the Silence)" onto YouTube from their final ever live performance played at the Usen Studio Coast in Tokyo, Japan on 16 November 2021. They released it in commemoration of the venue during its closure.

On 29 January, the band announced to their fans on Line that they were in the US recording their full-length seventh studio album. Bassist Ryo Shimizu, later confirmed the news on Instagram on 31 January that they were indeed recording the follow-up to The Side Effects. However, they recorded the album in the studio without guitarist Kazuya Sugiyama who chose to record his parts of the album remotely in Japan due to recently having his first child. On 10 February, it was announced that the band had been selected for the opening theme for the new Netflix original anime Bastard!!, that would be slated to release in June 2022 on the platform. The band documented the process of the recording of the new album and published it under the title "7th Full Album Recording Diaries" onto YouTube over the course of the next couple of months. The first part was published on 11 February while the fourth and final part was released on 15 April. The series was directed by Masahiro Yamada. During this time, the band released official live videos of songs from their Three Elements concert from "Coldrain TV" onto their YouTube channel. They would first release the video for "Revolution" and continued to publish "After Dark", "Vena/F.T.T.T", "Rescue Me", "Mayday" featuring Ryo Kinoshita of Crystal Lake, "Carry On", "Gone" and "The Revelation" to then conclude with "January 1st" on 13 April 2022. Longtime producer for the band, Michael Baskette revealed on 20 March 2022 that the production for the album had concluded and that the band had flown back to Japan a couple of days prior after the recording process had been completed.

On 16 April, they held their fifteenth-anniversary live stream for their fans on YouTube which is where they formally revealed their seventh studio album Nonnegative for the first time. It was released on 6 July 2022 via Warner Music Japan. The previously released single "Paradise (Kill the Silence)" was revealed alongside a lineup of ten new original songs and a cover of No Doubt's "Don't Speak" to be included on the album. After the stream concluded and the clocks hit 00:00JST on 17 April in Japan, the band released the second single "Calling" from the album alongside a music video to commemorate their fifteen years together as a band.

On 4 June, the band were revealed to have provided a preview for one of the new songs from the album, "From Today", for the TV advert promoting the Aquos X LED 30. A couple of days later on 6 June, the band previewed the new single "Before I Go" as a part of the promotional campaign for the Sapporo Breweries product, Sapporo Beer Gold Star. They then fully released the song with an accompanying music video on 8 June. On 15 June, another song from the album, "Bloody Power Fame", was previewed in the new trailer as the opening theme for the Netflix anime, Bastard!! The song was later released as a single on 30 June alongside the release of the anime. On 6 July, the band released the fifth single, "Cut Me", alongside an accompanying music video concurrently with the album's release.

On 5 September, the band appeared and performed at "Treasure9x4". During the performance, they announced the second edition of Blare Fest that was scheduled to take place on 4 & 5 February 2023. They later announced bands such as Hoobastank, Wargasm, Don Broco, Crystal Lake and SiM would be performing at the event as well as many others. On 15 January 2023, it was announced that the band would be supporting Papa Roach and The Used on their co-headline "Cut My Heart Into Pieces" Australian tour in April 2023, starting in Perth, Australia on 21 April and ending on 30 April in Brisbane, with that being the only show that the band would unable to attend due to scheduling conflicts. On 2 February, the band announced their fifth live video album, 15x(5+U) Live at Yokohama Arena to be released on 19 April 2023, with a live music video for "Calling" recorded at the arena released alongside the announcement.

Artistry 
The band's musical style has been described as post-hardcore, metalcore, alternative metal, alternative rock, punk rock, screamo, hard rock, nu metal, and electronic rock.

Early in its career the band played songs that sounded like alternative rock and especially like post-hardcore, accompanied by guitar pieces reminiscent of classic metalcore and thrash metal riffs. By their third album, The Revelation, coldrain's music came to be defined as a mix of post-hardcore and metalcore. According to other critics, certain influences instead recall genres like pop punk and screamo, and the band has been likened to groups like My Chemical Romance, Pay Money to My Pain, Asking Alexandria, Destroy Rebuild Until God Shows, Bullet for My Valentine and A Day to Remember. Masato Hayakawa himself has stated Linkin Park and Incubus to be his biggest influences to start recording music. When Y.K.C, the main composer of the band, was asked about songwriting, he said, "It is essential not to forget 'why a song is cool', the song itself needs to have holding power, and only then is there meaning. That's what I try not to forget when composing."

Band members 
  – lead vocals
  – lead guitar, programming, piano, keys
  – rhythm guitar, baritone guitar, backing vocals
  – bass guitar, backing vocals
  – drums, percussion

Discography

Albums

Studio albums

Live albums

Extended plays

Singles

Maxi-singles

Digital singles

Covers

Compilation appearances

Collaborations

Awards and nominations
Space Shower Music Awards

|-
| 2020
| Coldrain 
| Best Punk/Loud Rock Artist
| 
|-
| 2021
| Triple Axe
| Best Punk/Loud Rock Artist
| 
|}

Concert tours

Headlining
Final Destination Tour (2009)
Nothing Lasts Forever Tour (2010)
The Enemy Inside Tour (2011)
Through Clarity Tour (2012)
The Revelation Tour (2013)
Until the End Tour (2014)
Vena Japan Tour (2015–16)
Vena European May 2016 Tour (2016)
Fateless A Decade in the Rain Tour (2017)
Another Decade in the Rain Tour (2018)
Summer 2019 European Tour (2019)
The Side Effects One Man Tour (2019)
Paradise One Man Tour (2021)

Supporting
Crossfaith Apocalyze Japan Tour (2013)
Man with a Mission Tales with Purefly Japan Tour (2014)
Bullet for My Valentine European Tour (2014)
Crossfaith European Tour (2014)
One OK Rock 35xxxv Japan Tour (2015)
Papa Roach United Kingdom Tour (2015)
Bullet for My Valentine Venom European Tour (2015)
Volumes and Northlane North American Tour (2015)
Silverstein North American Tour (2016)
Vans Warped North American Tour with Various Artists (2016)
SiM The Beautiful People Japan Tour (2016)
One Ok Rock Ambitions Japan Tour (2017)
Crown the Empire European Tour (2018)

Music videos

Official videos

Live videos

References

External links

 
 
 
 

Japanese alternative rock groups
Japanese alternative metal musical groups
Japanese metalcore musical groups
Screamo musical groups
Post-hardcore groups
Japanese hard rock musical groups
Japanese punk rock groups
Musical groups established in 2007
Musical quintets
Musical groups from Aichi Prefecture
Hopeless Records artists
Sony Music artists
Warner Music Group artists
2007 establishments in Japan
English-language musical groups from Japan